Tandi is a feminine given name. Notable people with the name include:

Tandi Iman Dupree (1978–2005), American drag queen and pageant girl
Tandi Indergaard (born 1978), English diver
Tandi Mwape (born 1996), Zambian footballer
Tandi Wright (born 1970), New Zealand actress

See also
Tandi (disambiguation)